Washington Mills-Mayodan Plant, also known as Mayo Mills, Washington Group-Mayodan Plant, and Tultex Corp.-Mayodan Plant, was a historic textile mill and national historic district located at Mayodan, Rockingham County, North Carolina. It encompassed four contributing buildings and two contributing structures in the town of Mayodan.  The main spinning mill was built in 1895, and was a three-story, rectangular brick structure with a low-pitched gable roof.  The mill was expanded several times between 1897 and 1954.  It featured a four-story, one bay, tower with an open belfry at the top.  Also on the property were the contributing knitting mill (1911), transformer house (c. 1900), railroad underpass, railroad spur, and frame wood shed. The mill closed in 1999.

The mill buildings were demolished in 2012.

It was listed on the National Register of Historic Places in 2005.

References

Textile mills in North Carolina
Industrial buildings and structures on the National Register of Historic Places in North Carolina
Historic districts on the National Register of Historic Places in North Carolina
Buildings and structures in Rockingham County, North Carolina
National Register of Historic Places in Rockingham County, North Carolina